Genetically modified agriculture includes:

 Genetically modified crops
 Genetically modified livestock

Genetic engineering
Genetically modified organisms